Amerikaz Nightmare is the sixth studio album by hip-hop duo Mobb Deep. The album was released on Jive Records, through a deal with the group's own imprint. It features the singles "Got It Twisted" and "Real Gangstaz." The album debuted at #4 on the Billboard 200 with approximately 109,000 copies sold in its first week of release. The album sold around 500,000 copies.

Track listing

Samples
"Amerika’z Nightmare" contains samples of “Kismet” by Amon Düül.
"Throw Your Hands (In the Air)" contains samples of "Live In Connecticut" by Cold Crush Brothers, "Doggone" by Love and "Still Life" by Esperanto.
"Got It Twisted" contains samples of "She Blinded Me With Science" by Thomas Dolby and "Saturday Night Style" by Mikey Dread.
"Win Or Lose" contains samples of "Here I Go Again" by Jean Plum.
"Neva Change" contains samples of "Time for a Change" by The Eight Minutes.
"When U Hear" contains samples of "No Promise of Tomorrow (Reprise)" by Howard Kenney.
"We Up" contains a sample from "Optimum" by Ten Plus.

Personnel

Artists
 Mobb Deep – primary artist (all tracks)
 Prodigy – primary artist (all tracks)
 Havoc – primary artist (all tracks)
 Nate Dogg – featured artist (track 4)
 Lil Jon – featured artist (track 9)
 Jadakiss – featured artist (track 10)
 Littles – featured artist (track 13)
 Big Noyd – featured artist (track 13)
 Twista – featured artist (track 16)
Technical personnel
 Tom Coyne – mastering
 Steve Sola – mixing, recording
 Mike Berman – mixing (tracks 5, 7, 9, 11–16), recording (tracks 1, 3–5, 7–9)

Record producers
 Havoc – production (tracks 1, 3, 4, 8, 10, 11, 13–15)
 The Alchemist – production (tracks 2, 5, 6, 16)
 Red Spyda – production (track 7)
 Lil Jon – production (track 9)
 Kanye West – production (track 12)
Additional personnel
 Daniel Hastings – art direction, design, photography

Charts

Weekly charts

Year-end charts

References

Mobb Deep albums
2004 albums
Jive Records albums
Albums produced by the Alchemist (musician)
Albums produced by Havoc (musician)
Albums produced by Kanye West
Albums produced by Lil Jon